La Salle High School is a private Catholic secondary school of the La Salle Brothers in Faisalabad, Pakistan.

History
Bishop F.B Cialeo OP, while Bishop of Multan, requested the La Salle Brothers to run an English language school in Multan. In 1959, the Bishop was transferred to Lyallpur (Faisalabad). On his arrival he felt the need to establish a La Salle High School in the People's Colony.

In September 1961, the La Salle Sisters began teaching students in years 6 to 10 in their residence while a building was under construction. The classes shifted to new premises in January 1962. The rolls stood at 196 on 10 January 1970, but numbers increased steadily and with the opening of the Nursery Section the attendance exceeded one thousand.

Luigi Bressan, the Vatican pronuncio to Pakistan, visited the school on 8 September 1989. Maxwell Shanti, the school principal, spelled out the features of La Salle education, noting that more than any other results, La Salle was aiming at character formation.

In 2005, the school launched Cambridge studies.

As of January 2012, the school had 5670 students, eight brothers, and 110 teachers (41 male and 69 female). The domestic staff comprised 22 men and 3 women.

La Salle Schools have been in Pakistan since 1932. In 2012 the school celebrated its Golden Jubilee and several functions were announced for the students of the 2011-12 session, scattered throughout the year.

On 13 September 2019 the newly appointed bishop of Faisalabad Joseph Indrias Rehmat was ordained at the School. The Principal Consecrator was Joseph Cardinal Coutts, Archbishop of Karachi and his co-consecrators were Archbishop Christophe Zakhia El-Kassis, Apostolic Nuncio and Archbishop Joseph Arshad, Bishop of Islamabad-Rawalpindi.

Founder
Saint John Baptist de La Salle (born 3 December 1208 Rheims, France; died 15 April 1727 in Saint-Yon, Rouen) was a priest, educational reformer, and founder of the Institute of the Brothers of the Christian Schools. He is a saint of the Roman Catholic Church, and the patron saint of teachers.

1679, what began as a charitable effort to help Adrian Nyel establish a school for the poor in De La Salle's home town gradually became his life's work. He thereby began a new order, the Institute of the Brothers of the Christian Schools, also known as the De La Salle Brothers (in the U.K., Ireland, Australia and Asia) or, most commonly in the United States, the Christian Brothers. They are sometimes confused with a different congregation of the same name founded by Blessed Edmund Ignatius Rice in Ireland, who are known in the U.S. as the Irish Christian Brothers.

Logo and motto
The five-pointed radiant star is the worldwide logo of the Salle Brothers, "Signum Fidei". It symbolizes the spirit of faith.

The school motto is "God, Truth, Charity".

Staff and faculty
 Principal: Rev. Bro Shahid Mughal
 Vice Principal: Mr. Qamar Joseph
 Principal - Primary Section: Ms. Zeenat Javed
 Head Mistress  Girl High School : Ms. Ruby Johnson
 Head Mistress Cambridge Section: Ms Rukhsana Dominic
 Guidance and counselling - Brother Waseem Sulakhan
 Administrator College: Mr. Amir Shahzad

Notable alumni 

 Muhammad Shahzaib Aslam (Chief Prefect 2005) CEO SAR ZONE

References

Schools in Faisalabad
Catholic secondary schools in Pakistan
Faisalabad
1962 establishments in Pakistan
Private schools in Pakistan
Educational institutions established in 1962